Eoin French (born 1987), known professionally as Talos, is an Irish indie electronic musician from Cork.

Early life
Eoin French grew up on the north side of Cork. He trained as an architect and lectured in architecture at University College Cork. He was a member of the band Hush War Cry, and also studied at Cork School of Music. His stage name is a reference to the mythical Talos, a giant automaton made of bronze that protected Crete.

Career
Talos began his career in 2013. His first album, Wild Alee, was nominated for the Choice Music Prize, and The Irish Times awarded it four stars, calling it "a spectacularly assured debut deserving of a wide audience". His second album, Far Out Dust, was released in 2019. His third album, Dear Chaos, is due for release on 7 Oct 2022.

Discography

Studio albums
 Wild Alee (2017)
 Far Out Dust (2019)
 Dear Chaos (2022)

EPs
 Tethered Bones (2014)
 O Sanctum (2016)
 Live at St. Luke's (2018)

References

External links
 

1987 births
21st-century Irish people
Living people
Irish electronic musicians
Irish folk singers
Musicians from Cork (city)
Alumni of University College Cork
Academics of University College Cork